Oi Dai is Värttinä's 3rd album, and the first after they re-formed in 1990 after losing many members. It was released in 1991 in Finland by Spirit/Polygram. It was a great success, and led to Värttinä touring throughout Europe. In 1994, it was released in the United States by Xenophile Records. It was later re-released in the US by NorthSide.

Track listing
"Marilaulu" (traditional, arranged by Värttinä) – 2:08
"Mie oon musta" (trad., arr. Värttinä) – 2:17
"Viikon vaivane" (traditional/S. Kaasinen, arr. Värttinä) – 4:23
"Kamaritski" (trad., arr. Värttinä) – 2:15
"Miinan laulu" (trad., arr. Värttinä) – 3:13
"Ukko lumi" (trad., arr. Värttinä) – 2:09
"Vot vot ja niin niin" (trad., arr. Värttinä) – 2:41
"Tupa täynnä tuppasuita" (trad., arr. Värttinä) – 2:34
"Oi dai" (trad., arr. Värttinä) – 3:43
"Tantsukolena" (trad., arr. Värttinä) – 2:07
"Kiiriminna" – 2:43
"Yks on huoli" (traditional/S. Kaasinen, arr. Värttinä) – 4:07

Personnel
Mari Kaasinen – vocals
Sari Kaasinen – vocals, kantele, 2-row accordion
Kirsi Kähkönen – vocals
Sirpa Reiman – vocals
Minna Rautiainen – vocals
Christer Hackman – percussion
Janne Lappalainen – wind instruments
Tom Nyman – bass
Riitta Potinoja – accordion
Kari Reiman – fiddle
Tommi Viksten – guitar, mandola

External links
Värttinä's page on album, with lyrics and samples

Värttinä albums
1991 albums